Martha's Vineyard Museum (MV Museum), originally named the "Dukes County Historical Society," is a historical and cultural museum located in Vineyard Haven and founded in 1922.

History 
The founders of the MV Museum acquired revolutionary era documents, realizing the historical importance of the documents they started a collection and an organization, the Dukes County Historical Society.

In 1996, the Society changed its name to the Martha's Vineyard Historical Society to reflect an emphasis on Martha's Vineyard. In 2006, the organization decided to change the name from the Martha's Vineyard Historical Society to the Martha's Vineyard Museum.  In 2019, the Martha's Vineyard Museum completed its move from its Edgartown campus to its new location: a refurbished and expanded 1895 marine medical facility in Vineyard Haven, Massachusetts.

Gallery

References 

Art museums and galleries in Massachusetts
Martha's Vineyard
Buildings and structures in Tisbury, Massachusetts
Tourist attractions in Vineyard Haven, Massachusetts
Museums in Dukes County, Massachusetts